Sharktooth Peak is a summit located in Fresno County, California. It is situated on Silver Divide in the Sierra Nevada range. The first ascent of the summit was made prior to 1951 by an unknown party. The Southeast Ridge was first climbed in 2002 by Steve Eckert.

Climate
According to the Köppen climate classification system, Sharktooth Peak is located in an alpine climate zone. Most weather fronts originate in the Pacific Ocean, and travel east toward the Sierra Nevada mountains. As fronts approach, they are forced upward by the peaks (orographic lift), causing them to drop their moisture in the form of rain or snowfall onto the range. Precipitation runoff from the mountain drains into tributaries of the Middle Fork San Joaquin River.

See also

References

External links
 Weather forecast: Sharktooth Peak

Sierra National Forest
Mountains of Fresno County, California
Mountains of the John Muir Wilderness
North American 3000 m summits
Mountains of Northern California
Mountains of the Sierra Nevada (United States)